Ichstedt is a village and a former municipality in the district Kyffhäuserkreis, in Thuringia, Germany. Since 1 January 2019, it is part of the town Bad Frankenhausen. The village was mentioned in a charter of Louis the German in 874 for the first time. The village was once a moated castle, which was located on the site of the later manor.  By 1918, the town belonged to the principality of Schwarzburg-Rudolstadt.

References

Former municipalities in Thuringia
Kyffhäuserkreis
Schwarzburg-Rudolstadt